Hook River is a natural watercourse in the southern Canterbury region of New Zealand's South Island.  The river flows east from its source to the Wainono Lagoon, a fresh water lake beside the Pacific Ocean.  On the way, it passes through the localities of Waiariari and Hook and is crossed by State Highway 1 and the Main South Line railway.  Water from the river and an associated aquifer is used for agricultural purposes.

References 

Rivers of Canterbury, New Zealand
Rivers of New Zealand